Coleman v. Miller, 307 U.S. 433 (1939), is a landmark decision of the United States Supreme Court which clarified that if the Congress of the United States—when proposing for ratification an amendment to the United States Constitution, pursuant to Article V thereof—chooses not to set a deadline by which the state legislatures of three-fourths of the states or, if prescribed by Congress state ratifying conventions in three-fourths of the states, must act upon the proposed amendment, then the proposed amendment remains pending business before the state legislatures (or ratifying conventions). The case centered on the Child Labor Amendment, which was proposed for ratification by Congress in 1924.

Background 
The practice of limiting the time available to the states to ratify proposed amendments began in 1917 with the Eighteenth Amendment.  All amendments proposed since then, with the exception of the Nineteenth Amendment and the Child Labor Amendment, have included a deadline, either in the body of the proposed amendment, or in the joint resolution transmitting it to the states. In its decision the Court concluded that Congress was quite aware in 1924 that—had it desired to do so—it could have imposed a deadline upon the Child Labor Amendment and Congress simply chose not to.

Decision 
According to Coleman, it is none other than the Congress itself—if and when the Congress should later be presented with valid ratifications from the required number of states—which has the discretion to arbitrate the question of whether too much time has elapsed between Congress' initial proposal of that amendment and the most recent state ratification thereof assuming that, as a consequence of that most recent ratification, the legislatures of (or conventions conducted within) at least three-fourths of the states have ratified that amendment at one time or another.

The Coleman ruling—which modified the high Court's earlier 1921 dictum in Dillon v. Gloss—held that the question of timeliness of ratification is a political and non-justiciable one, leaving the issue to the discretion of Congress. Thus it would appear that the length of time elapsing between proposal and ratification is irrelevant to the validity of the amendment. Based upon the Court's reasoning in Coleman, the Archivist of the United States proclaimed the Twenty-seventh Amendment as having been ratified when it surpassed the "three fourths of the several states" threshold for becoming a part of the Constitution.

Impact 
The Coleman decision has been described as reinforcing the political question doctrine which is sometimes espoused by Federal courts in cases wherein the court deems the matter at hand to be properly assigned to the discretion of the legislative branch of the Federal government. In light of the precedent established by this case, three proposed constitutional amendments, in addition to the Child Labor Amendment, are considered to be still pending before the state legislatures (the Congressional Apportionment Amendment since 1789; the Titles of Nobility Amendment since 1810; and the Corwin Amendment since 1861), as Congress did not specify a ratification deadline when proposing them to the states.

See also 
 List of United States Supreme Court cases, volume 307

References

External links

 

United States Supreme Court cases
United States Supreme Court cases of the Hughes Court
United States Constitution Article Five case law
United States political question doctrine case law
1939 in United States case law